Rokeby is a civil parish about 2.5 miles from Barnard Castle, in the County Durham district, in the ceremonial county of Durham, England. The parish includes the hamlet of Greta Bridge. In 2011 the parish had a population of 158. The parish touches Barningham, Boldron, Bowes, Brignall, Egglestone Abbey, Westwick, Whorlton and Wycliffe with Thorpe. The A66 runs through the area. Rokeby shares a parish council with Brignall and Egglestone Abbey called "Rokeby, Brignall & Egglestone Abbey Parish Council".

Features 
There are 38 listed buildings in Rokeby.

History 
The name "Rokeby" means 'Hroca's farm/settlement' or 'rook farm/settlement'. Rokeby was recorded in the Domesday Book as Rochebi. There are no remains of the deserted medieval village of Rokeby or the deserted medieval village of Mortham. Rokeby was "Rochebi" in the 11th century and Rookeby in the 16th and 17th centuries. On 1 April 1974 Rokeby was transferred from the county of Yorkshire North Riding to Durham.

See also 
 Rokeby Park

References

External links
 

Civil parishes in County Durham